KMJQ (102.1 FM) is a commercial radio station in Houston, Texas.  Owned by Urban One, "Majic 102" has an urban adult contemporary radio format.  KMJQ is co-owned with 97.9 KBXX and 92.1 KROI, with studios and offices located in the Greenway Plaza district.  KMJQ is one of the high-ranking stations in Greater Houston, sometimes reaching number-one.  It is also one of the most honored UAC stations in the U.S, according to radio trade publications.

KMJQ has an effective radiated power (ERP) of 100 kilowatts, the maximum for non-grandfathered FM stations in the U.S.  The transmitter is on Blueridge Trail in Southwest Houston.  KMJQ broadcasts in the HD Radio hybrid format.  The HD2 subchannel carries an urban gospel format, known as "Praise Houston", which is also broadcast on sister station KROI.

History

KAJC-FM
In 1961, the station originally signed on the air as KAJC-FM.  The station's original city of license was Alvin, Texas, and it was powered at only 3,200 watts, a fraction of its output today.  The studios and transmitter were also located in Alvin.

At a time when FM typically aired beautiful music or classical music, it was the first FM station in the Houston area to broadcast adult contemporary music and hourly news.  In 1962 and 1963 it became the first FM station in Texas to win major news awards from the UPI Texas Broadcasters' Association, including story of the year and best news coverage in population class.

KMSC
In 1964, the station was sold, changing its call sign to KMSC.  The city of license was moved to Clear Lake City on Galveston Bay.  The power was increased to 100,000 watts, greatly expanding the station's coverage of Greater Houston.

Styled as the "Voice of the Manned Spacecraft Center", KMSC broadcast news about the space program and easy listening music. In November 1969, the station call letters changed to KLYX or "Clicks," and the format changed to (lite AC). The new format debuted on Thanksgiving Day of that year.

All-News KLYX
In 1975, KLYX became a network affiliate of new NBC News and Information Service (NIS).  NBC provided 24 hours a day of all-news radio programming, with some local news inserts from KLYX.  NIS aired on 102.1 from 1975 until the end of the service in early 1977. KLYX's local news inserts originated from new studios in Houston.

The station was permitted to bypass one of the FCC rules, known as the "Arizona Waiver."  It was named after a Glendale, Arizona station, owned by the Arizona Broadcasting Corporation. Back when the main studio of a station had to be inside the city of license, the Arizona Waiver gave stations an out by allowing a station to air its recorded, non-network shows from an 'auxiliary' studio (in this case, Houston) while its live local public affairs shows would air from a city of license studio. This worked well with the easy listening format, as 94% of the station was recorded music and commercials. The 6% news and non entertainment items could originate from the main studio. This was expanded to let the station broadcast its local and non network shows from the Clear Lake studios.

In 1979, the community of Clear Lake City was annexed by Houston, meaning that Houston became KLYX's official city of license. In 1982, the transmitter was moved from downtown Houston (Shell Plaza tower farm, where it had been since 1973) to the new shared tower at Missouri City.

KMJQ
The station was relaunched in 1977 as KMJQ, with the branding "Majic 102 FM", becoming Houston's first FM station to carry an urban contemporary format.  It went on to obtain high listenership among African American audiences, as well as a diverse audience in the Houston market.

KMJQ was sold by Keymarket Media to the San Diego-based Noble Broadcasting in 1988; it became co-owned with KYOK months later, which transitioned from an R&B/Soul format to a full-fledged Urban Contemporary format as "YO! 1590 Raps" in the early 1990's.

In the early 1990s, KMJQ changed its branding to "Majic 102 Jams" or just simply "102 Jams".  Some reggae was played in rotation during the transition, along with R&B, soul, gospel, new jack swing, jazz, funk and hip hop.  It gained some competition from KHYS (now KTJM) in the mid-1980s for some time.  But in 1991, KMJQ gained fierce competition from KBXX (the former KFMK) upon that station's relaunch.  KBXX, then a rhythmic contemporary station (mixing in hip hop, R&B and some dance pop titles), quickly emerged as KMJQ's prime competitor for their mutual targeted audience demographic. The battle over the coveted 18-34 "urban" listening audience continued for three years, affecting KMJQ's dominance, as it fell behind KBXX and dropped in the ratings.

Ownership changes
The rivalry between KMJQ and KBXX ended in 1994, when KBXX was sold to Clear Channel Communications, who, a short time later, would buy KMJQ in 1995 from Noble, separating it from KYOK (then on 1590 AM). That year, KMJQ modified its format to urban adult contemporary and returned the "Majic 102 FM" branding. From then on, the station focused more on R&B and classic soul music only and targeted an older audience, while co-owned KBXX focused on younger listeners.

In 2000, when Clear Channel bought out several other radio corporations (as a result of the Telecommunications Act of 1996), KMJQ and KBXX were spun off to the Washington, D.C.-based, black-owned Radio One.  (Radio One changed its name to Urban One in 2018.)  Also in 2000, KMJQ became the Houston affiliate of the nationally syndicated "Tom Joyner Morning Show".

In 2003, the station rebranded as "Majic 102.1" to avoid frequency confusion with Beaumont, Texas Urban radio station KTCX ("Magic 102.5"), although longtime listeners still refer to the station as "Majic 102" based on heritage.  For a brief period in 2008, the station carried Mo'Nique in the Afternoon through Radio One's syndicated division. In 2011, when KROI dropped its five-year urban gospel format for an all-news radio format, KMJQ added a digital subchannel to carry that previous format now known as "Praise Houston."

In popular culture
"Majic 102 Jams!" was featured throughout the 1994 film Jason's Lyric.

References

External links
Official website

Urban One stations
MJQ
Urban adult contemporary radio stations in the United States
Radio stations established in 1978